The border between the modern states of Germany and Switzerland extends to , mostly following the High Rhine between Lake Constance and Basel.

Much of the border is within the sphere of the Zurich metropolitan area and there is substantial traffic, both for commuting and for shopping across the border, with the S22 line of the suburban Zürich S-Bahn running across German territory. The Swiss municipality of Kreuzlingen forms part of the conurbation of German Konstanz. Similarly, the Trinational Eurodistrict of Basel includes territory in both France and Germany.

History
The High Rhine has had the character of the northern border of the Old Swiss Confederacy since the Swabian War and the accession of Basel in 1499–1501, dividing the Swiss Confederacy from the Swabian Circle of the Holy Roman Empire; with the Peace of Westphalia of 1648, the border acquired the status of an international border de jure.

With minor changes (such as the acquisition of Rafzerfeld in 1651), it remained unchanged since, even throughout the Napoleonic era when it divided two French client states (Cisrhenian Republic and Helvetic Republic) and later the Confederation of the Rhine from the restored Swiss Confederacy, and eventually the German Confederation from modern Switzerland.
The border persisted even during the Nazi era (although with the Anschluss of Austria, the German-Swiss border technically included the Austrian-Swiss border from 1938 and until the formation of the German Federal Republic in 1949).

On 12 December 2008 Switzerland implemented the Schengen Agreement. This removed all passport controls for travellers crossing the border; however, customs officers from both countries are still authorised to carry out customs checks on border crossers, as Switzerland is not in the EU Customs Union.

In mid-2016, during the European migrant crisis, the German government deployed an additional 90 border guards and 40 police officers in order to reduce the level of illegal immigration passing through Switzerland.

Railway lines
Railway lines crossing the border are:
Rhine Valley Railway between Basel (Badischer) and Weil am Rhein
Wiese Valley Railway between Basel (Badischer) and Lörrach
High Rhine Railway between Basel (Badischer) and Grenzach
High Rhine Railway between Erzingen and Schaffhausen
High Rhine Railway between Schaffhausen and Singen
Lake Line between Konstanz and Kreuzlingen
Turgi–Koblenz–Waldshut railway between Koblenz and Waldshut
Eglisau–Neuhausen railway line between Rafz and Lottstetten
Eglisau–Neuhausen railway line between Jestetten and Neuhausen Rheinfall
The Basel tram line 8 was in 2014 extended across the border to Weil am Rhein in Germany.

Some railway stations are border stations, where there are customs and previously passport control of both countries in the building. Such stations include Basel Badischer Bahnhof (located on Swiss territory near the border, but operated as a German station) and Konstanz station. It is possible to change trains without going through any border or customs control.

Since Switzerland's accession to the Schengen Area in 2008, there have been no permanent passport controls along this border, even if there can be customs controls.

Geography

The German-Swiss border begins in at the German-Swiss-Austrian tripoint,  located within  Lake Constance.
The precise location of the border within Lake Constance has never been agreed upon officially.

Lake Constance separates the German Bodenseekreis from the Swiss canton of Thurgau.
The short stretch of border (c. ) between Constance and Kreuzlingen comprises the only territory of Germany on the left bank of the High Rhine.

The border then runs along the Untersee, passing south of Reichenau. At the lake's exit it turns inland, towards the north, leaving Stein am Rhein within Switzerland, as well as the municipality of Ramsen (canton of Schaffhausen). It then returns to the Rhine, including Gailingen in Germany, but then turns north again to include the bulk of the canton of Schaffhausen, a right-bank territory including the town of Schaffhausen itself, in Switzerland, separating it from the German Schwarzwald-Baar-Kreis and Waldshut district. Büsingen am Hochrhein (Constance district) is a German exclave which has borders with three Swiss cantons, namely Zurich, Schaffhausen, and Thurgau.

The border returns to the Rhine downstream of the Rhine Falls, then separating the Waldshut district from the canton of Zürich, but then deviates from the river again to include the Rafzerfeld plain into Zürich's Bülach district (a right-bank territory historically acquired by the city of Zürich from the counts of Sulz in 1651).
Downstream of Rafzerfeld, the border then sticks to the course of the Rhine until it enters the city of Basel, forming the northern border of the canton of Aargau as far as Kaiseraugst and then the canton of Basel-Land (municipalities of Pratteln and Muttenz) bordering on the German Lörrach district.

Besides the right-bank part of Basel proper (Lesser Basel) the border also includes the right-bank municipalities of Riehen and Bettingen into the canton of Basel-Stadt. The border then cuts across the E35 south of Weil am Rhein and back to the Rhine, where it terminates in the French-German-Swiss tripoint, dividing into the French-German and the French-Swiss borders. A monument has been built near it, known as the Dreiländereck.

References

Thomas Wüthrich, Adrian Wiget, Beitrag zur Konstruktion der Landesgrenze Deutschland – Schweiz im Untersee swisstopo (2008).

External links

 
European Union external borders
Borders of Germany
Borders of Switzerland
International borders